The Act 1 Jac 1 c 11, sometimes called the Bigamy Act 1603, the Bigamy Act 1604, the Statute of Bigamy 1603 or the Statute of Bigamy 1604, was an Act of the Parliament of the Kingdom of England. It created the offence of bigamy as a capital felony. Bigamy had not previously been a temporal offence (that is to say, within the jurisdiction of the common law courts as opposed to the ecclesiastical courts).

Further provision was made by the 35 Geo 3 c 67.

Section 1

References

Acts of the Parliament of England
1603 in law
1603 in England
Repealed English legislation
Marriage law in the United Kingdom
Polygamy law